H. H. "Harry" Johnston was an American football and basketball coach.  He was the 18th head football coach at Doane College in Crete, Nebraska, serving for four seasons, from 1919 to 1922, and compiling a record of 16–11–4.  Johnston was also the head basketball coach at Doane from 1919 to 1923, tallying a mark of 36–15.  Johnston captained the 1914 Doane football team. He also coached at a high school in Crete in the 1940s.

References

Year of birth missing
Year of death missing
Doane Tigers football coaches
Doane Tigers football players
Doane Tigers men's basketball coaches